The 2014–15 Liga II was the 75th season of the Liga II, the second tier of the Romanian football league system.

The 23 teams were divided into two series (with 12 and 11 teams, respectively). The regular season was played in a round-robin tournament. The first six teams from each series played a play-off for promotion to Liga I. The teams placed 7th to 12th played in a Relegation play-out. 
The first team in each series was promoted at the end of the season to the Liga I, and the teams placed below the 10th place were relegated to the Liga III.

Teams
At the end of 2013-14 season, Iași, Rapid București from Seria I and ASA, Universitatea Craiova from Seria II were promoted to Liga I. Six teams were relegated to Liga III : Dunărea, Buzău, Farul (Seria I), FCU Craiova, UTA and Minerul (Seria II).

The winners of the six 2013–14 Liga III series were promoted to Liga II: Dorohoi, Voluntari, Balotești, Caransebeș, Șoimii and Fortuna.

After the end of the last season, FCU Craiova, Dunărea, Vaslui and Corona were dissolved. Bistrița and UTA withdrew from Liga II and enrolled to Liga III.

Renamed teams

FC Clinceni was moved to Pitești and renamed Academica Argeș.

Stadia by capacity and locations

Seria I

Seria II

League tables

Seria I

Seria II

Promotion play-offs

At the end of the regular season, the first six teams from each series will play a Promotion play-off and the winners will promote to Liga I. The teams will start the play-off with the number of points gained in the regular season.

Seria I

Seria II

Relegation play-outs

At the end of the play-out, the teams that finish on 5th or 6th place from each series will relegate to Liga III and the 4th place from Seria I will play a Play-Out match with the 10th place of Seria II, the winner will remain in Liga II while the team which will lose this match will relegate to Liga III.

Seria I

Seria II

See also

 2014–15 Liga I
 2014–15 Liga III

References

2014-15
Rom
2